Tõlliste Parish was a rural municipality of Estonia, in Valga County.

Settlements
Small boroughs
Laatre – Tsirguliina
Villages
Iigaste – Jaanikese – Korijärve – Muhkva – Paju – Rampe – Sooru – Supa – Tagula – Tinu – Tõlliste – Väljaküla – Vilaski

References

External links
Official website